Mother Courage and her Children is a 2010 album by Duke Special, featuring the songs he composed and performed for the National Theatre's 2009 production of Berthold Brecht's play Mother Courage and Her Children, with Brecht's lyrics translated by Tony Kushner.

It was released both on its own and as part of a box set entitled The Stage, A Book And The Silver Screen, which also includes The Silent World of Hector Mann and the Huckleberry Finn EP, funded via the online crowdsourcing platform PledgeMusic.

Track listing

References

External links
Description page on Duke Special's website

2010 albums
Duke Special albums